The Mother Instinct is a 1917 American silent drama film directed by Lambert Hillyer and Roy William Neill and starring Enid Bennett, Rowland V. Lee and Margery Wilson.

Cast
 Enid Bennett as Eleanor Coutierre 
 Rowland V. Lee as Jacques
 Margery Wilson as Marie Coutierre 
 Tod Burns as Pierre Bondel 
 John Gilbert as Jean Coutierre 
 Gertrude Claire as Mother Coutierre 
 William Fairbanks as Raoul Bergere

References

Bibliography
 Golden, Eve. John Gilbert: The Last of the Silent Film Stars. University Press of Kentucky, 2013.

External links
 

1917 films
1917 drama films
1910s English-language films
American silent feature films
Silent American drama films
American black-and-white films
Films directed by Lambert Hillyer
Films directed by Roy William Neill
Triangle Film Corporation films
1910s American films